Francis Ellis (20 September 1889 - July 1960) was an English cricketer. He played for Gloucestershire between 1914 and 1921, playing 26 matches. He scored 241 runs and took 70 wickets. His best bowling was 6-90 against Kent in 1914.  Francis died in July 1960.

References

1889 births
Year of death missing
English cricketers
Gloucestershire cricketers
Cricketers from Gloucester